The 2010 Men's Central American and Caribbean Basketball Championship, also known as 2010 Centrobasket, was hosted in the Dominican Republic.  This edition was the first time that the Centrobasket featured ten teams in the finals; previously, eight teams had qualified. Puerto Rico won the title with an 89-80 victory over Dominican Republic.  Panama captured the bronze medal with a 75-74 victory over Cuba.  All four teams qualified for the FIBA Americas Championship 2011.  Jamaica finished 5th for their best ever performance at the tournament while Belize finished 7th to match their best performance.  The British Virgin Islands finished 8th after qualifying for Centrobasket for the first time in their history.

First round

Group A

Group B

Bracket

Semifinals

The top 2 teams from each group advance to the semifinals, in which the top team of Group A plays against the second place team of Group B and the top team of Group B plays against the second place team of Group A.

Three-team ties are determined by the point differential in games played between the three teams, not counting the margin of victory or loss against a non tied team.

Third-place game

Final

Final standings

References

External links
 Official tournament website 

Centrobasket
2010–11 in North American basketball
2010 in Central American sport
2010 in Caribbean sport
2010 in Dominican Republic sport
International basketball competitions hosted by the Dominican Republic
July 2010 sports events in North America
21st century in Santo Domingo
Sports competitions in Santo Domingo
Qualification tournaments for the 2011 Pan American Games